The Black Cauldron may refer to:

 The Black Cauldron (novel), the second novel in The Chronicles of Prydain series
 The Black Cauldron (film), the Disney animated film based on The Chronicles of Prydain book series
 The Black Cauldron (video game), the video game based on the film
 The Black Cauldron, or Black Crochan, the eponymous magical, iron cauldron in the novel

See also
 
 
 
 
 Cauldron (disambiguation)
 Witches Cauldron (disambiguation)
 The Children of Llyr
 Four Branches of the Mabinogi#Second Branch: Branwen, Daughter of Llŷr
 Cast-iron cookware, including cast-iron cauldrons

Black Cauldron, The